is an interchange railway station located in the city of Machida, Tokyo, Japan, operated by East Japan Railway Company (JR East) and Odakyu Electric Railway.

Lines

Station layout
JR East Machida Station has two island platforms serving four tracks, with the station building located above and perpendicular to the platforms, and has a "Midori no Madoguchi" staffed ticket office. 
Odakyu Machida Station also has two elevated island platforms serving four tracks, while located inside a station building containing a supermarket and department store.

JR Platforms

Odakyu Platforms

History

Station numbering was introduced to the Odakyu Line in January 2014 with Machida being assigned station number OH27. In 2016, Number assignments were introduced to the Yokohama Line platforms on 20 August of that year with those facilities being assigned station number JH23.

Passenger statistics
In fiscal 2019, the JR station was used by an average of 110,899 passengers daily (boarding passengers only). During the same period, then Odakyu station was used by 289,419 passengers daily.

Surrounding area
 Machida City Museum of Graphic Arts
 Machida Civic Hall
 Machida Municipal Hospital
 Sagamihara, Kanagawa

See also
 List of railway stations in Japan

References

External links

 JR East  
 Odakyu  

Railway stations in Japan opened in 1908
Railway stations in Japan opened in 1927
Yokohama Line
Odakyu Odawara Line
Railway stations in Tokyo
Stations of East Japan Railway Company
Stations of Odakyu Electric Railway
Machida, Tokyo